The 2010 Italian Athletics Championships was the 100th edition of the Italian Athletics Championships and were held in Grosseto from 30 June to 1 July.

Champions

References

External links 
 Italian Athletics Federation

Italian Athletics Championships
Athletics
Italian Athletics Outdoor Championships